Woodin may refer to

People
 Mike Woodin (1965-2004), UK politician
 Sarah Woodin, American biologist
 W. Hugh Woodin (born 1955), US mathematician
 William B. Woodin (1824–1893), New York politician
 William Hartman Woodin (1868-1934), US Secretary of Treasury

Places
 Woodin, Arizona, a populated place in Coconino County

See also
 Woodin cardinal